"Dysfunctional" is the second studio album by Australian band Bachelor Girl, released in Australia through Gotham Records on 5 August 2002 (see 2002 in music).

Track listing
 I'm Just a Girl (Written By J.Roche)
 Drowning Not Waving (Written By J.Roche)
 Rollercoaster (Written By P.Thornalley & M.Lewis)
 Walking With Shoes on Fire (Written By J.Roche & T.Doko)
 Can't Wait To Meet You (Written By J.Roche & T.Doko)
 Shaping My Universe (Written By J.Roche & T.Doko)
 Why Wait? (Written By J.Roche)
 I Am Myself (Written By J.Roche & T.Doko)
 Falling (Written By J.Roche & T.Doko)
 Nothing at All (Written By J.Roche & T.Doko)
 Last Thing (Written By J.Roche & T.Doko)

 Drowning, Not Waving (Remix) – Hidden Track Following 'Last Thing'

Charts

Release history

References

Bachelor Girl albums
2002 albums
Gotham Records albums